Osea Sadrau is a Fijian rugby league footballer who plays as a  for the West Coast Storms in the Fiji National Rugby League Competition and also contracted to the Kaiviti Silktails. He previously AS Carcassonne in the Elite One Championship in France. He is a Fijian international.

Sadrau represented Fiji at both the 2008 and 2013 Rugby League World Cups.

In May 2014, Sadrau played for Fiji in the 2014 Pacific Rugby League International.

In May 2015, Sadrau played for Fiji in the 2015 Melanesian Cup.

References

External links
Fiji v France: Teams

1986 births
Fijian rugby league players
Fiji national rugby league team players
Kaiviti Silktails players
AS Carcassonne players
Rugby league props
Living people
I-Taukei Fijian people